The Christmas Battle (Italian: La battaglia di natale) was fought between forces of the Soviet Red Army and the Italian Expeditionary Corps in Russia from 25 December to 28 December, 1941, during Operation Barbarossa, when the Soviest launched a multi-division attack in the gap between the Italian expeditionary force and the German XLIX Mountain Corps. The goal of the attack was to open the path to Stalino and threaten vital Axis railway junctures.Scianni, p. 110.

The attack was conducted on Christmas day by the Soviet 35th and 68th Cavalry divisions plus the 136th Rifle Division, and was primarily aimed at the Italian Celere cavalry division, later backed by parts of the Torino and Pasubio infantry divisions. Bearing the brunt of the attack against numerically-superior opposition, the Celere held their sector. The limited Soviet gains were rolled back by Dec 27, when formations from Pasubio and Torino, plus the German 318th Infantry Regiment (with supporting armor), counterattacked and regained the lost ground. In the end, for the cost of 168 dead and 207 missing, the Italians had defeated the Soviets, who lost over 2,000 dead; the Italians also took 1,200 Soviet troops prisoner and captured 24 76mm guns, 9 anti-tank guns, and large stockpiles of machine guns and vehicles. The Italian victory was partly due to close collaboration between their infantry and artillery.

The 3rd Bersaglieri Regiment played a decisive part in the fighting, defending against ten-fold superior forces before falling back, and participating in the counterattack.

Notes

Battles and operations of the Soviet–German War
Battles and operations of World War II involving Italy
Conflicts in 1941
Italy–Soviet Union relations